The Michigan Golf Classic was a tournament on the PGA Tour that was played in September 1969 at the Shenandoah Golf & Country Club, a par-70, 6,708-yard course in Walled Lake, Michigan. The event was won by Larry Ziegler, a 30-year-old from Bonne Terre, Missouri, and was his first PGA Tour win. He defeated former University of Houston star Homero Blancas with a birdie on the second hole of a sudden-death playoff.

Tournament Supervisor George Walsh shocked the players when he revealed that the sponsors of the fledgling tournament said they didn't have enough money to pay all the prizes. Players had been promised a total purse of $100,000 with $20,000 and a new car going to the winner.

Winners

References

Former PGA Tour events
Golf in Michigan
1969 establishments in Michigan
1969 disestablishments in Michigan